Black City Breakdown (1985–1986) is the first of two L.A. Guns compilation albums featuring their third singer Paul Black.

It was released in 2000, recorded over 1985–1986. Songs from it would also appear on 2005's Black List, though none had release before this album.

Track listing
"Everything I Do"
"L.A.P.D."
"Roll the Dice"
"On & On"
"Name Your Poison"
"Winter's Fool"
"Stranded"
"Love Is a Crime"
"Word to the Wise Guy"
"Liquid Diamonds"
"One More Reason to Die"
"Black City Breakdown"
"Looking Over My Shoulder"

Line up
Paul Black: lead vocals
Tracii Guns: guitar
Robert Stoddard: guitar
Mick Cripps: bass
Nickey "Beat" Alexander: drums

L.A. Guns compilation albums
2000 compilation albums